Pier Giovanni "Vanni" Canepele (18 June 1916 – 8 July 1983) was an Italian tennis player.

A native of Bologna, Canepele was a three-time national singles champion. He made the singles third round at Wimbledon twice and played for the Italy Davis Cup team from 1937 to 1939, then again in 1949.

During the 1950s and 1960s, Canepele served several stints as non-playing captain of Italy in the Davis Cup. This included runner-up finishes in 1960 and 1961, both times to Australia.

Canepele played a season of Serie A basketball for Virtus Bologna in 1938-1939.

See also
List of Italy Davis Cup team representatives

References

External links
 
 
 

1916 births
1983 deaths
Italian male tennis players
Italian men's basketball players
Virtus Bologna players
Sportspeople from Bologna
Italian tennis coaches